Barlows Hill is a rural locality in the Livingstone Shire, Queensland, Australia. In the  Barlows Hill had a population of 777 people.

History 
The locality was officially named and bounded on 18 February 2000.

In the  Barlows Hill had a population of 777 people.

References 

Shire of Livingstone
Localities in Queensland